Namlish (a portmanteau of the words Namibian and English) is a form of English spoken in Namibia. The term was first recorded in 1991.

English is the country's official language since independence in 1990. Because it is the second or third language for the majority of the Namibians, local usage can vary significantly from usage elsewhere in the English-speaking world. Namibian English, or Namlish, shares many similarities with South African English, having been influenced both by Afrikaans and indigenous African languages.

Examples of Namlish

Vocabulary

Expressions

Literal translations

Namlish comes from literal translations, mostly from Oshiwambo, Kavango languages and Afrikaans, but occasionally from Damara, Herero or other tribal languages. Namlish is generally spoken by the Oshiwambo and Kavango speaking people. In the Oshiwambo language, the "l" and "r" are exchanged. In Kavango, they are not exchanged.
 Example 1: "I'm coming now" comes from the Afrikaans saying "Ek kom nou," as well as the Oshiwambo saying, "Onde ya paife."
 Example 2: When people are greeting another, they occasionally say "yes sir" which is translated exactly from the Afrikaans saying, "ja meneer."
 Example 3: Namlish speakers often use only the present continuous, or present progressive aspect of a verb at times when native English speakers would employ the present simple. This is due, in part, to direct translation from Oshiwambo and Kavango to English. In Oshiwambo and Kavango, the verb form remains the same in either case. Whenever someone wants to indicate possession of anything, he or she "is having" that particular object. The same goes for use of the past continuous tense in the place of the simple past.
 Example 4: When people ask time they often say "how late is it?" which is translated from Afrikaans "Hoe laat is dit?" and German "Wie spät ist es?".
 Example 5: Some of the Oshiwambo speaking people would say "Led" instead of "Red".
 Example 6: When asking how you are doing, Namibians would say, "Whatz up" which comes from the word "weni" from Kavango.

Some observations
 Many Namibians repeat single-word responses twice, e.g. "Hi hi", "Fine fine" and "Sharp sharp" are all common responses in casual conversation.
 Upon asking How are you? Namlish speakers will greet you with Yes! or Yebo! Yebo comes from Zulu, which is an emphatic "yes" said throughout southern Africa.
 Directions can be very vague: That side is usually the answer.
 This one and that one are frequently used to talk about children and elderly people.
 'I'm coming now now', 'I'm coming just now', 'I'm coming right now': All rather vague variations regarding time. Each repetition of the word "now" represents a closer approximation of the typical English "now". Three repetitions of the word is generally the most you will hear. It usually means a minute or less before the activity in question begins. 
 "I'm coming" can mean numerous things. Usually, it means "I'm leaving and coming back within 5 minutes or not at all". Whereas "I'm coming now now" means "I'm coming right back now for sure".
 The word "somehow" is used to describe an event that was all-right, average, or unexceptional. When asked about a day, weekend, holiday, etc., Namibians often respond by saying it was "somehow". (Namibians frequently use, as in this instance, an adverb in place of an adjective. Another example of this is the use of the word "better". When asked about an exam, the response is often simply, "Better". What it is better than is never specified.)
 Whenever asking "How are you?", nearly always the answer is "fine".
 When talking about something small, Namibians use "ka..." (kaboy: small/little boy, kathing: something small in size).
 Words like "kutja" (pronounced as kusha) or Kama/kamastag are used instead of "apparently".
 First names and surnames become confused, e.g. Peter Smith can be referred to as Mr. Peter, not Mr. Smith.

Pronunciation
As Namlish is its own dialect of English, it has its own pronunciation of English words. For instance, clothes is almost always pronounced with two syllables. Even Hifikepunye Pohamba (Namibia's former president) pronounces it this way.

See also
 German language in Namibia
 Chinglish
 Engrish
 Germish
 Spanglish
 Tinglish

References

Languages attested from the 1990s
Languages of Namibia
Dialects of English
Macaronic forms of English